Riab may refer to:
 Riab, Gilan
 Riab, Razavi Khorasan